Fazıl Şenel is CEO and founder of HACE Technology company based in Ankara, Turkey. The Company focus on the Consultancy on Energy Projects;
 Renewable Energy 
 Energy Efficiency 
 Investments on Energy Projects 
 Oil and Gas
 Exploration, Transportation and Distribution  

Fazıl Şenel was General Manager of Tuzgolu Underground Gas Storage Project between 2018 and 2021. Before then, He was high commissioner / board member at EMRA ( Energy Market Regulatory Authority, EPDK ) and board member at TUBITAK MAM. He has been elected as Vice President of MEDREG on 15 November 2012. MEDREG is the Association of Mediterranean Regulators for Electricity and Gas.

Fazıl Şenel was Chairman and General Manager of BOTAŞ, Turkey’s state-owned pipeline company until March 21, 2012. He had joined BOTAŞ in 2007, first serving as group manager and later as technical vice president.
 
Mr. Şenel’s varied career has spanned the oil, natural gas, energy, and automotive industries. He worked as a Project Engineer for Istanbul Gas Distribution Industry and Trade Inc., and as a research assistant at Iowa State University and Sakarya University. He has also served as an engineer, project manager, regional manager, and senior executive in the firms from the United States, Middle East, and Europe.
 
Mr. Şenel holds a bachelor's degree from Istanbul Technical University’s Faculty of Mechanical Engineering, and a Master’s in Automotive Engineering from the same university. He also completed graduate work in mechanical engineering at Iowa State University.
 
Mr. Şenel speaks English, and has a working knowledge of Arabic and Azerbaijani.

References

External links 

 http://www.epdk.gov.tr
 http://www.medreg-regulators.org
 http://www.botas.gov.tr

Turkish businesspeople
Living people
Year of birth missing (living people)